Springer v. Government of the Philippine Islands, 277 U.S. 189 (1928), was a decision of the United States Supreme Court concerning the Appointments Clause.   

Background:  

Springer v. The Government of the Philippine Islands is an action of quo warranto, on behalf of the Government against Milton E. Springer, Dalamacio Costas, and Anselmo Hilario, the three directors of the National Coal Committee. The Philippine Legislature created a coal company and a bank, and the majority of the stock is owned by the government itself. The company was created through Act No. 2705, and the Governor-General was required to subscribe fifty-one percent of the capital of the corportation. The power to vote on the stock arguably lied in a committee or a Board of control. The board is composed of the Governor-general, the Speaker of the House of Representatives, and the President of the Senate. Defendants argued that section 4 of Act No. 2705, which was amended by section 2 of Act No. 2822 was invalid. Section 2 of Act No. 2822 stated that voting on behalf of the Philippine Islands is exclusively vested in the committee. The Philippine Legislature passed statute Act No. 2705, which defined the duties of the board of control.  

Supreme Court’s Ruling: 

Ultimately, Section 4 of Act No. 2705, amended by Section 2 of Act No. 2822 is invalid. The Philippine Legislature unlawfully determined who of its members sit on the committee, while still legally providing a National Coal Company. Appointments to positions lie in the Executive powers, not the Legislative.

References

External links 
 

1928 in United States case law
United States Supreme Court cases
United States Supreme Court cases of the Taft Court
Appointments Clause case law
United States separation of powers case law